Archi Fataki (born 25 May 1989) is French professional footballer who plays as a forward for SC Schiltigheim.

Career
Fataki started his senior career with Toulouse. In 2012, he signed for Kastrioti in the Albanian Kategoria Superiore, where he made 26 appearances and scored six goals. After that, he played for KF Lushnja, Progrès Niederkorn, Toulouse Rodéo, Aviron Bayonnais, Balma, ES Paulhan-Pézenas, Atakum Belediyespor, Monts d'Or Azergues Foot. He joined Rouen in summer 2018.

References

External links 
 Archi Fataki: "I need to find a club before January 31"
 Interview: Archie Fataki shoots the management of AFC Tubize
 Fataki, scavenger of FC Rouen
 Interview: Archie Fataki
 Interview Archi Fataki

Living people
1989 births
Footballers from Toulouse
French footballers
Association football forwards
Championnat National 2 players
Championnat National 3 players
Challenger Pro League players
Kategoria Superiore players
Luxembourg National Division players
A.F.C. Tubize players
Tarbes Pyrénées Football players
KS Kastrioti players
KS Lushnja players
FC Progrès Niederkorn players
Toulouse Rodéo FC players
Aviron Bayonnais FC players
GOAL FC players
Balma SC players
ES Paulhan-Pézenas players
FC Rouen players
SC Schiltigheim players
Place of birth missing (living people)